Loverboy Classics was a compilation album by the Canadian rock band Loverboy, released on October 11, 1994. In 1998, the album was certified Gold by the RIAA for shipments of half a million copies.

The album covered more ground than the previous compilation album Big Ones, and outsold it by far as well. It still does not contain their 1983 #34 U.S. hit "Queen of the Broken Hearts".

Track listing

Personnel
 Mike Reno - lead vocals
 Paul Dean - guitar, backing vocals
 Doug Johnson - keyboards
 Scott Smith - bass
 Matt Frenette - drums
 Nancy Nash - backing vocals
 Bruce Fairbairn - producer

References

1994 compilation albums
Loverboy albums
Albums produced by Bruce Fairbairn
Columbia Records compilation albums
Legacy Recordings compilation albums